The 1925–26 Drexel Blue and Gold men's basketball team represented Drexel Institute of Art, Science and Industry during the 1925–26 men's basketball season. The Blue and Gold, led by 1st year head coach Ernest Lange, played their home games at Main Building.

Roster

Schedule

|-
!colspan=9 style="background:#F8B800; color:#002663;"| Regular season
|-

References

Drexel Dragons men's basketball seasons
Drexel
1925 in sports in Pennsylvania
1926 in sports in Pennsylvania